Chwalibogowo may refer to the following places:
Chwalibogowo, Słupca County in Greater Poland Voivodeship (west-central Poland)
Chwalibogowo, Września County in Greater Poland Voivodeship (west-central Poland)
Chwalibogowo, Kuyavian-Pomeranian Voivodeship (north-central Poland)